The Face of War (The Visage of War; in Spanish La Cara de la Guerra) (1940) is a painting by the Spanish surrealist Salvador Dalí. It was painted during a brief period when the artist lived in California.

The trauma and the view of war had often served as inspiration for Dalí's work. He sometimes believed his artistic vision to be premonitions of war. This work was painted between the end of the Spanish Civil War [1936] and the beginning of the Second World War. [1939]

The painting depicts a withered, disembodied head hovering against a barren desert landscape. The face is withered like that of a corpse and wears an expression of fear and misery. In its mouth and eye sockets, there are identical faces. In their mouths and eyes, there are more identical faces in a process implied to be infinite. Swarming around the large face are biting serpents. In the lower right corner is a handprint that Dalí insisted was left by his own hand.

The painting is owned by the Museum Boijmans Van Beuningen, in Rotterdam, but was on loan to Te Papa Tongarewa in Wellington until November 2021.

References

Sources
dali-gallery.com 

1940 paintings
Paintings in the collection of the Museum Boijmans Van Beuningen
Paintings by Salvador Dalí
Paintings about death
Anti-war paintings
Surrealist paintings